The Avenir valencien is a French rugby union club based in Valence-d'Agen. It's playing in Fédérale 1.

Palmarès 
 Fedrale 1:
 Champion (1) : 1964
 Finalist (1) : 1977
 Fédérale 2 :
 Champion (1) : 2007
 Challenge of l'Espérance :
 Winner (3) : 1992, 2001, 2010, 2011
 French championship " Nationale B" :
 Finalist (2) : 1988, 1993
 Challenge of l'Essor :
 Winner (2) : 1983, 2007

2016-17

Famous Players 
 Fabien Barcella
 Christophe Guiter
 Nicolas Durand
 Lionel Faure
 Marcel Laurent
 Cyriac Ponnau
 Konstantin Rachkov
 Gilles Dutour
 Bernard Delbreil
 Pablo Lemoine

External links 
 Official website

French rugby union clubs
Avenir Valencien
1903 establishments in France
Sport in Tarn-et-Garonne